The Reading Room is a 2005 American made-for-television drama film that originally premiered on Hallmark Channel.  It was directed by Georg Stanford Brown.

Plot
William Campbell (James Earl Jones) is a wealthy businessman who has just lost his wife.  He decides to make good on a promise he made her by opening a free reading room in an inner-city neighborhood where he grew up.  Despite his good intentions, problems in the neighborhood threaten his establishment, especially from local gang members and a preacher (Georg Stanford Brown) who questions Campbell's motives.

Cast
 James Earl Jones as William Campbell
 Georg Stanford Brown as Rahim
 Joanna Cassidy as Diana Weston
 Keith Robinson as Darrel
 Douglas Spain as Javier
 Monique Coleman as Leesha
 Jessica Szohr as Dayva
 Gabby Soleil as Majoli
Austin Marques as Edgar
 Tim Reid as Douglas

Awards
Camie (2006) Won 
 Image Award (2006) Nominated for Outstanding TV Movie, Mini-Series or Dramatic Special
 Vision Award (2006) Nominated for Best Drama
 WGA Award (TV) (2006) Nominated

External links
 
 

2000s English-language films
2005 drama films
2005 television films
2005 films
Hallmark Channel original films
Films directed by Georg Stanford Brown